is a Japanese actor from Shinagawa, Tokyo, best known for portraying Arata Kagami/Kamen Rider Gatack in the tokusatsu series Kamen Rider Kabuto.

Biography
Sato was born on February 22, 1984. His hobbies include baseball, snowboarding, and playing guitar and bass.

Filmography

Television

Films

References

External links
Official website
Official profile at Ever Green Entertainment
Official twitter
Official blog
Old official blog (1)
Old official blog (2)

1984 births
People from Shinagawa
Kamen Rider
Japanese male actors
Living people